"Go Tell It on the Mountain" is an African-American spiritual song which was likely derived from the oral tradition, but was originally written and published by John Wesley Work Jr., although there is some debate whether he was actually the first to write it. This spiritual  has been sung and recorded by many gospel and secular performers since considered a Christmas carol as its original lyrics celebrate the Nativity of Jesus:

An alternate final line omits the reference to the birth of Christ, instead declaring that "Jesus Christ is Lord".

Due to the oral tradition of the song, "Go Tell It on the Mountain" has also been used as a Easter song, with the refrain taking the variant of:

Publication history 
The earliest known publication of the song is attributed to John Wesley Work, Jr. (1871-1925) who published the song in the New Jubilee Songs as Sung by the Fisk Jubilee Singers (1901). Work grew up in Nashville where he garnered a love for music from his father who was a choir director.  He earned his Master’s in Latin and went on to teach ancient Latin and Greek.However,  his first love continued to be music, and became the first African-American collector of Negro spirituals. Most African-American spirituals through oral tradition but Work, through his extensive research, was able to compile many songs into the “New Jubilee Songs”. It was not until the second version he published that “Go Tell it On the Mountain” was included.   While many books and websites attribute the New Jubilee Songs as Sung by the Fisk Jubilee Singers to John Wesley Work, Jr. in 1901, some sources argue the origins lie with Frederick Jerome Work in 1902.

Biblical references 
"Go Tell It on the Mountain" references the Annunciation to the Shepherds described in the Gospel of Luke, hence the alternate title of "While shepherds kept their watching". The Nativity is also referenced in the final verse of the song:

Recording artists
In 1963, the musical team Peter, Paul and Mary, along with their musical director Milt Okun, adapted and rewrote "Go Tell It on the Mountain" as "Tell It on the Mountain", their lyrics referring specifically to Exodus and using the phrase "Let my people go", but referring implicitly to the civil rights struggle of the early 1960s. This version became a moderately successful single for them (US No. 33 pop, 1964).  Cash Box described it as "a rhythmic, updating of the folk oldie with a plaintive message-song motif."

According to religious studies professor and civil rights historian Charles Marsh, it was African-American civil rights leader Fannie Lou Hamer who combined this song with the spiritual "Go Down Moses", taking the last line of the chorus, "let my people go" and substituting it in the chorus of "Go Tell It on the Mountain". Marsh does not document this claim, but notes that Hamer was highly active in civil rights work beginning in the 1950s, and that the use of the Exodus story and the singing of spirituals played a central role in her activities.

Little Big Town's 2006 non-album single version reached No. 35 on the Hot Country Songs chart.

Popular African- American Contemporary Christian music band Maverick City Music recorded and published their own version of “Go Tell it On the Mountain” in 2021.

See also
 List of Christmas carols

References

Christmas carols
Songs about Jesus
Peter, Paul and Mary songs
Mahalia Jackson songs
American Christmas songs
African-American spiritual songs
Songwriter unknown
Year of song unknown
Esther & Abi Ofarim songs
Songs about mountains